Roland Garber (born 27 August 1972 in Vienna) is a former Austrian cyclist. He rode in the Madison at the 2000 and the 2004 Summer Olympics.

Palmares

Track
2002 
1st World Cup Madison (with Franz Stocher)

Road
1998
2nd National Time Trial Championships

References

1972 births
Living people
Austrian male cyclists
Cyclists at the 2000 Summer Olympics
Cyclists at the 2004 Summer Olympics
Olympic cyclists of Austria